is the generic name for the three Shinto gods Sokotsutsu no O no Mikoto (底筒男命), Nakatsutsu no O no Mikoto (中筒男命), and Uwatsutsu no O no Mikoto (表筒男命). The Sumiyoshi sanjin are regarded as the gods of the sea and sailing.

The Sumiyoshi taisha has four buildings dedicated to four kami—the three Sumiyoshi brothers and Empress Jingū who is also enshrined.

According to Japanese mythology as written in works such as the Kojiki and Nihon Shoki, the Sumiyoshi sanjin were born together with the Watatsumi Sanjin (綿津見三神) when Izanagi performed a purification ceremony after returning from Yomi.

Originally the Sumiyoshi sanjin and Watasumi sanjin were the same gods, but when, in ancient times, the throne was moved east from Kyūshū to the area now known as Kinki, it was the Sumiyoshi sanjin that supposedly served an important role. In other words, the Watatsumi sanjin stayed in Kyūshū and the Sumiyoshi sanjin moved to Kinki.

Of the Shinto Shrines that enshrine the Sumiyoshi sanjin the oldest are Sumiyoshi jinja in Hakata-ku, Fukuoka city, Fukuoka prefecture, Sumiyoshi jinja in Iki city, Nagasaki prefecture, and Moto Sumiyoshi jinja in Kobe, Hyōgo prefecture. However, it is not known which one of these is the oldest.

The tsutsu part of the names of the three gods has a connection to the planets, and there is a theory suggests the Sumiyoshi sanjin are the deification of the three main stars in the Orion constellation. In the olden days the Orion constellation was used for navigational purposes so it was perhaps for this reason that they were deified. Also, the locations of Tsutsu on Tsushima Island, Tsutsuki on Iki Island, Tsutsuki in Itoshima, Fukuoka prefecture are in the arrangement of these three Orion stars.

Notes

References
 Nussbaum, Louis-Frédéric and Käthe Roth. (2005).  Japan encyclopedia. Cambridge: Harvard University Press. ;  OCLC 58053128

External links

Japanese gods
Shinto kami
Stellar gods
Sea and river gods